Twin Creeks gold mine, also known as Twin Creeks Mine, is an active open pit mine near Winnemucca, Nevada.

It is a gold and silver mine operated by Newmont. The Chimney Creek gold deposit, now part of Twin Creek, was first identified in the 1980s. A rare specimen of orpiment discovered in the mine
was donated to the Smithsonian.

In 1911, the Battle of Kelley Creek occurred in the area.  Eventually, a marker was placed just to the west of where the mine was later located.  The 1996 environmental impact statement mentions a reconfiguration of an overburden and interburden site so as to avoid the location of the marker for the battle.

In 1993, the Twin Creeks mine was created as a combination of the Chimney Creek and Rabbit Creek mines during a coal-for-gold swap between Santa Fe Pacific and Hansen Natural Resources.

References

Gold mines in Nevada